Dąbie  (German: Eichenberg) is a village in the administrative district of Gmina Borne Sulinowo, within Szczecinek County, West Pomeranian Voivodeship, in north-western Poland. 

See also
History of Pomerania

External links
 Jewish Community in Dąbie on Virtual Shtetl

References

Villages in Szczecinek County